Jana Černochová (born 26 October 1973) is a Czech politician, serving as Czech Minister of Defence in the Cabinet of Petr Fiala since December 2021. She has been a member of the Czech parliament since 2010, representing the Civic Democratic Party (ODS).

Biography
Černochová graduated from high school in 1992 and began working in a bank. She later studied international relations at the Metropolitan University Prague.

Political career

After joining ODS in 1997, Černochová became active in municipal politics and became Mayor of Prague 2. She became a member of parliament in 2010. Following the 2017 elections, she became the chair of the Chamber of Deputies' defence committee.

In December 2021, she was named Minister of Defence in the Cabinet of Petr Fiala. A few days later Černochová resigned as Mayor of Prague 2 and was replaced by Alexandra Udženija.

Political views 
Černochová is a supporter of gun rights. She is a concealed carry license holder and carries a Glock 26 Olive Gen4. She also owns a special edition CZ 75B Operace Anthropoid pistol and a PAR MK3 rifle, a Czech made AR 15 variant.

Awards
  Order of Princess Olga, 2st class (2022)

References

1973 births
Living people
Politicians from Prague
Civic Democratic Party (Czech Republic) mayors
Civic Democratic Party (Czech Republic) MPs
21st-century Czech women politicians
Members of the Chamber of Deputies of the Czech Republic (2017–2021)
Members of the Chamber of Deputies of the Czech Republic (2013–2017)
Members of the Chamber of Deputies of the Czech Republic (2010–2013)
Members of the Chamber of Deputies of the Czech Republic (2021–2025)
Civic Democratic Party (Czech Republic) Government ministers
Women government ministers of the Czech Republic
Defence ministers of the Czech Republic
Female defence ministers
Women mayors of places in the Czech Republic